Dorothy Wilson (November 14, 1909 – January 7, 1998) was an American movie actress of the 1930s.

Early life 
Wilson was born and raised in Minneapolis, Minnesota, moving to Los Angeles, California after her high school graduation. Ironically, she had no interest in acting and had moved to Los Angeles due to an urge to travel.

Career 
In 1930, she began working as a secretary and applied at several employment agencies. She received a job at RKO Pictures, and for two years she worked there as a secretary. She often took notes for director Gregory La Cava; she was noticed by the executive in charge of casting and offered a screen test for La Cava's upcoming 1932 film The Age of Consent. She won one of the two lead coed roles, opposite Richard Cromwell. Her performance in the movie received good reviews.

The same year, she was selected as one of the WAMPAS Baby Stars, along with future Hollywood legend Ginger Rogers and Gloria Stuart. She starred opposite some of Hollywood's biggest names, including Harold Lloyd, Richard Dix, Tom Keene, Preston Foster and Will Rogers. She appeared in 20 films between 1932 and 1937.

She was asked to test for the part of Melanie Hamilton in the epic movie Gone with the Wind, which she did, but she did not win the role, its being awarded to Olivia de Havilland. She starred in only two films after getting married, and then retired from acting to devote time to her family. She returned to acting only once, in an uncredited role in the 1943 film Whistling in Brooklyn.

Personal life and death 
In 1936, she had married scriptwriter Lewis R. Foster, whom she had met while filming the 1934 movie Eight Girls in a Boat. Foster won an Oscar for his script for Mr. Smith Goes to Washington, released in 1939 and starring James Stewart and Jean Arthur, based on Foster's book The Gentleman from Montana. 
She and Foster remained together and raised a family of two children. Foster died in 1974. Dorothy never remarried and was residing in Lompoc, California at the time of her death on January 7, 1998.

Partial filmography

 The Age of Consent (1932) - Betty Cameron
 Men of America (1932) - Anne
 Lucky Devils (1933) - Fran Whitley
 Scarlet River (1933) - Judy Blake
 Before Dawn (1933) - Patricia
 Above the Clouds (1933) - Connie
 Eight Girls in a Boat (1934) - Christa Storm
 His Greatest Gamble (1934) - Alice Stebbins
 The Merry Widow (1934) - Maxim Girl (uncredited)
 The White Parade (1934) - Zita Scofield
 When a Man's a Man (1935) - Kitty Baldwin
 One in a Million (1935) - Dorothy 'Babe' Brooks
 Circus Shadows (1935) - Elaine Cavanaugh
 The Last Days of Pompeii (1935) - Clodia
 Bad Boy (1935) - Sally Larkin
 In Old Kentucky (1935) - Nancy Martingale
 The Milky Way (1936) - Polly Pringle
 Hollywood Boulevard (1936) - Minor Role (scenes deleted)
 Craig's Wife (1936) - Ethel Landreth
 Speed to Spare (1937) - Eileen Hart
 Whistling in Brooklyn (1943) - Radio Quartette Member (uncredited) (final film role)

References

External links

 

American film actresses
Actresses from Minneapolis
1909 births
1998 deaths
Burials at Forest Lawn Memorial Park (Glendale)
20th-century American actresses
WAMPAS Baby Stars